Sangaria may refer to:

 Sangaria, India, a city and municipality in the Hanumangarh district of the Indian state of Rajasthan
 Sangaria (soft drink), a Japanese beverage company, manufactured and marketed by Japan Sangaria Beverage Co., Ltd.